An embassy chapel is a place of worship within a foreign mission. Historically they have sometimes acted as clandestine churches, tolerated by the authorities to operate discreetly. Since embassies are exempt from the host country's laws, a form of extraterritoriality, these chapels were able to provide services to prohibited and persecuted religious groups. For example, Catholic embassy chapels in Great Britain provided services while Catholicism was banned under the Penal Laws. A similar role was filled for Protestants by the Prussian embassy chapel in Rome, where Protestantism was unlawful until 1871. Upon laws granting freedom of religion, these embassy chapels have often become regularized churches and parishes, such as that of the Dutch embassy chapel to the Ottoman Empire, now The Union Church of Istanbul.

History
Early modern embassy staff, who commonly lived in the ambassadorial residence, were permitted to have in-house chapels and chaplains, especially where, in the wake of the Reformation, they lived in a country that banned their religious faith. These soon drew members of the same faith to join the worship services in the embassy. The Dutch Republic sponsored chapels in twelve of its embassies, which acted as churches for local Reformed Protestants. Leopold I, Holy Roman Emperor sponsored chapels wherever he could, "that Catholic services might be held to comfort the Catholics of the area, and to promote the further growth of this religion." By the late eighteenth century, a new legal principle had come into being, extraterritoriality, according to which "the ambassador and the precincts of the embassy stood as if on the soil of his homeland, subject only to its laws." As religious freedom advanced with time, many of the embassy chapels lost their function as safe havens and were converted into churches proper or dismissed.

Catholic embassies in London
During the reign of Elizabeth I, Catholicism was gradually outlawed in England, and Catholic masses and worship were prohibited, particularly after the Oath of Supremacy of 1559. With the "Act to retain the Queen's Majesty's subjects in their obedience", passed in 1581, the celebration of Mass was prohibited under penalty of a fine of two hundred marks and imprisonment for one year for the celebrant, and a fine of one hundred marks and the same imprisonment for those who heard the Mass. The reign of Charles I (1625–49) saw a small revival of Catholicism in England, especially among the upper classes. As part of their royal marriage settlement, Charles's Catholic wife, Henrietta Maria, was permitted her own royal chapel (the Queen's Chapel in London, as well as a chapel at Somerset House) and chaplain.

Ambassadors of Catholic nations sought to provide relief for persecuted English Catholics by protecting worship at their chapels with diplomatic immunity. The English government attempted unsuccessfully several times to dissuade such use of the Spanish and Portuguese embassies between 1563 and 1611. In 1610, James I asked foreign ambassadors not to allow English priests to celebrate at, or English Catholics to attend, their chapels, but only the Venetian ambassador complied. Starting in 1624, several arrests of English Catholics leaving these embassy chapels were made, which irritated the French ambassador, the Marquis of Blainville. On March 10, 1630, an order in council forbade Catholics to hear Mass at the embassies. The next Sunday, as reported by the Venetian ambassador, guards were placed in front of the French, Venetian and Spanish embassies, and Catholics were arrested as they left the premises; afterwards the Spanish ambassador, Don Carlos Coloma, unsuccessfully tried to obtain their release. Coloma diffused the issue by taking residence in the countryside, and demanding that the English government punish those who had violated his diplomatic immunity. Five years later, on April 12, 1635, the council directed Sir John Coke to inform the ambassadors that their diplomatic rights would not be infringed upon, but that penal laws against Catholics would be pursued. When a priest who had said Mass was captured and escaped to the house of the French ambassador Henri de Saint-Nectaire, where he was then recaptured, he was set free because of the right of extraterritoriality, and his pursuers were punished. Over time, enforcement of the law became lenient; Venetian ambassador Anzolo Corer wrote in 1636 that Mass at the chapel of the Queen and at the embassies was "frequented with freedom." In 1637, large crowds attended Mass daily at the Spanish embassy.

In eighteenth-century London, there were chapels in the French, Spanish, Florentine, Venetian (in the Haymarket), Portuguese (originally in Golden Square, then in South Street, Grosvenor Square), Austrian (on Hanover Street), Neapolitan (in Soho Square), Bavarian (on Warwick Street) and Sardinian embassies. In London, the streets outside the houses and house chapels of the Spanish, French and Venetian embassies were the scenes of public protests, sometimes violent. The police sometimes attempted to detain British people who attended Catholic services in the embassy chapels. Embassy chapels led to diplomatic tension between the English government and the Catholic governments who operated the embassies between 1625 and 1660. In the eighteenth century, English subjects ceased to be harassed for attending services at the Sardinian embassy. On Easter Sunday 1772 James Boswell and Pasquale Paoli "worshipped together at the Sardinian Chapel." When Catholic worship became allowed in London in 1791 with the Roman Catholic Relief Act, the Bavarian, Sardinian and Spanish embassy churches were converted into churches, while the others (Venetian, Neapolitan, Imperial, French and Florentine) were dismissed.

List

In London

Sardinian Embassy Chapel
Spanish Embassy Chapel, now St James's, Spanish Place
Royal Bavarian Chapel (Portuguese and then Bavarian embassy)
 French, Florentine, Neapolitan, Venetian, and Austrian embassies (non extant today)
 Russian Orthodox Chapel, former Russian Embassy in Welbeck Street
 St Etheldreda's Church

British chapels abroad
St George's chapel in the British Embassy in Madrid, today St George's Anglican Church
Chapel and English Cemetery in the British Consulate in Málaga
 British Embassy Chapel in Paris
 Christ Church, Jerusalem, the seat of the Anglican Diocese of Jerusalem, located on the site of the British Consulate until World War 1

Other
Prussian Embassy chapel in the Cottarelli Palace in Rome
Prussian embassy chapel in Turin, which hosted the Waldensian community before it was legalized in 1848
The Union Church of Istanbul, which started as the Dutch embassy chapel in Istanbul
Our Lady of Divine Providence Chapel, Kabul, the chapel of the Italian Embassy
Chapel of the Transfiguration, Ashgabat (Apostolic nunciature in Turkmenistan)
 Dormition of the Most Holy Theotokos Church in Beijing (Russian Embassy)
 Orthodox church of Saint Catherine  in Rome (Russian Embassy)
 Church of the Metamorphosis (Kottakis) (Russian embassy in Athens)
 Church of Saint Benoit, Istanbul and St Louis of the French chapels in Istanbul (French embassy)
 Spanish embassy chapel in Istanbul
Orthodox chapel in the Russian embassy in Turin

See also
House church
Clandestine church

References

Further reading
Harting, Johanna H. History of the Sardinian Chapel, Lincoln's Inn Fields. London: R. & T. Washbourne, 1905.
Kaplan, Benjamin J., Religious Conflict and the Practice of Toleration in Early Modern Europe, Harvard University Press, 2007
Trimble, William Raleigh. “The Embassy Chapel Question, 1625–1660.” The Journal of Modern History, vol. 18, no. 2, 1946, pp. 97–107. JSTOR, JSTOR, www.jstor.org/stable/1872115.

Religious persecution
Diplomatic immunity and protection